Kjøpmannskjær is a village and statistical area (grunnkrets) in Nøtterøy municipality, Norway.

The statistical area Kjøpmannskjær, which also can include the peripheral parts of the village as well as the surrounding countryside, has a population of 544.

The village Kjøpmannskjær is considered a part of the urban settlement Årøysund, which covers the southern part of the island. The urban settlement Årøysund has a population of 2,069.

References

Villages in Vestfold og Telemark